The following is a list of Iran national football team results in its official international matches.

1940s

1950s

1960s

1970s

1980s

1990s

2000s

2010s

2020s

See also
 Iran national football team head-to-head record
 Iran national football team Unofficial matches

References

 TeamMelli.com

External links
 FIFA.com
 RSSSF archive of Iran's results, by Majeed Panahi, RSSSF, 21 January 2006
 World Football Elo Ratings: Iran